Arlind Basha (born 8 February 1996, in Geneva) is a Kosovar-Albanian football player who was born in Switzerland. He most recently played for FC Haka in the Finnish Ykkönen.

Club career

KF Vëllaznimi
Arlind Basha started his career in KF Vëllaznimi at the age of 7. When he was 13 years old he went on a trial in Chievo but couldn't sign for them because he was to young. In April 2012 he made his senior debut for Vëllaznimi and scored his first goal on that debut match thus becoming the youngest ever goalscorer in the Football Superleague of Kosovo with 16 years of age.

Hajduk Split
In May 2012 Basha joined Hajduk Split on a trial and after some time the Hajduk board decided to sign him. Because of some bureaucratic problems Basha wasn't able to join the Hajduk senior squad until he was 18 years old. The first time he played for the Hajduk Split senior squad was in a friendly match against Beşiktaş J.K. on 10 November 2013. He came in as a late substitute in the 80th minute. During the   clubs winter preparations he was chosen by Hajduk manager Igor Tudor to join the squad for the following  2013–14 Prva HNL.

He made his debut in the Prva HNL on 14 February 2014 against NK Hrvatski Dragovoljac. He came in as a substitute in the 45th minute.

He was released from Hajduk Split in 2016.

Personal life
He was born in Geneva but at the age of 6 he and his family returned to Kosovo. He doesn't have Swiss papers so he is ineligible to play for the Switzerland national football team.

He expressed his great desire to play for the Albania or Kosovo national team.

References

External links

 http://www.slobodnadalmacija.hr/Hajduk/tabid/83/articleType/ArticleView/articleId/173223/Default.aspx
 http://www.slobodnadalmacija.hr/Hajduk/tabid/83/articleType/ArticleView/articleId/234135/Default.aspx

1996 births
Living people
Footballers from Geneva
Association football forwards
Kosovan footballers
KF Vëllaznimi players
HNK Hajduk Split players
FC Haka players
Kosovan expatriate footballers
Expatriate footballers in Croatia
Kosovan expatriate sportspeople in Croatia
Expatriate footballers in Finland
Kosovan expatriate sportspeople in Finland